Limoz Dizdari, Merited Artist of Albania, (born in 1942 in Delvinë) is an Albanian composer of classical music and music for movies.

References

1942 births
Living people
People from Delvinë 
20th-century classical composers 
Albanian composers
Merited Artists of Albania
Male classical composers
20th-century Albanian musicians
20th-century male musicians